Düzgün TV was a TV channel, based in Lünen, Germany that aired programming targeted at Turkish Germans. The channel filed for bankruptcy in 2007 and is no longer on air.

Format
Programming focused on assisting German Turks with integration into German society, as well as bringing them closer with Turkey. More broadly, it also promoted the democratization of Turkey and its admission into the European Union. A further stated goal was to provide coverage of Alevi lifestyle and culture, a religious group with many followers in both Germany and Turkey.

Programs were in Turkish, with German subtitles.

References

External links
 Official Site 

Mass media in Turkey
Defunct television channels in Germany
Television channels and stations established in 2006
Television channels and stations disestablished in 2007
2006 establishments in Germany
2007 disestablishments in Germany